Robert L. Carter (born 1945/1946) is a former justice of the Illinois Supreme Court. Carter was sworn in on December 8, 2020, and left office on December 5, 2022.

Early life and education 

Carter was a childhood resident of Grandview, Illinois. Carter received both his Bachelor of Arts from the University of Illinois at Urbana-Champaign, his Juris Doctor from the University of Illinois College of Law, and his Master of Arts from Sangamon State University.

Military service 

From 1969 to 1970, Carter served in the United States Army during the Vietnam War.

State court service

Illinois circuit court service 

The Illinois Supreme Court appointed Carter an associate judge for Illinois's 13th circuit for a term beginning July 2, 1979. He was elected a circuit court judge in 1988 and became the chief judge in 1992.

Illinois Appellate Court service 

Carter was appointed to the Illinois Appellate Court upon the retirement of Tobias Barry for a term beginning September 1, 2006. He was succeeded as resident circuit judge by then-State's Attorney Joseph P. Hettel.

Illinois Supreme Court 
In the 2020 general election, incumbent Justice Thomas L. Kilbride received approximately 56% of the vote in favor of his retention, which is less than the supermajority of 60% required by state law to be retained. After Kilbride lost retention, the Illinois Supreme Court appointed Carter as a placeholder until the 2022 general election. Carter's term began on December 6, 2020. He left office on December 5, 2022, when his successor was sworn in.

References

1940s births
Living people
Illinois Democrats
Justices of the Illinois Supreme Court
Military personnel from Illinois
People from Ottawa, Illinois
University of Illinois at Springfield alumni
University of Illinois Urbana-Champaign alumni
University of Illinois College of Law alumni